LeSportsac Inc. is an American handbag, luggage, and travel accessories company. It is owned currently by Itochu Corp.

Company

LeSportsac, Inc. started in 1974, by Melvin and Sandra Schifter as a travel accessories retail company that introduced a brand of luggage. Until the sale of the company LeSportsac products were made in the United States. Melvin and Sandra Schifter informally retired from day-to-day operations around 1990 leaving Melvin's son Tim Schifter to manage the company. During Tim's management the brand was revitalized and began to collaborate with fresh and innovative designers and brands. During November 2005, Accessory Network Group (“ANG”) purchased LeSportsac Inc.

During March 2011, Itochu Corp purchased the remaining assets owned by ANG. Currently Itochu Corp owns the world wide rights to the LeSportsac name and products.

Distribution

In 2001, LeSportsac opened its first US main store on Madison Avenue in Manhattan (closed in 2019). Presently, LeSportsac’s primary U.S. distribution is by means of the LeSportsac website.

Internationally, LeSportsac sells through exclusive distributors in Asia, South America, Europe, the Mid-Pacific and the Middle East. Its products are sold in more than 20 countries worldwide including Canada, Italy, Japan, Hong Kong, Korea, Taiwan, Malaysia, and Singapore.

References

External links
 Official LeSportsac website

Manufacturing companies of the United States
Bags (fashion)
Fashion accessory brands
Luggage brands
Luggage manufacturers
Companies based in New York City
American companies established in 1974
Manufacturing companies established in 1974
1974 establishments in New York (state)
2005 mergers and acquisitions
2011 mergers and acquisitions
Itochu